Doris Trachsel (born 27 April 1984) is a Swiss cross-country skier who has competed since 2001. She finished 30th in the individual sprint event at the 2010 Winter Olympics in Vancouver.

At the FIS Nordic World Ski Championships 2005 in Oberstdorf, Trachsel finished 11th in the 4 × 5 km relay and 47th in the 10 km event.

Her best World Cup finish was seventh in a 4 × 5 km relay at Italy in 2006 while her best individual finish was 16th in an individual sprint event at Canada in February 2010.

Cross-country skiing results
All results are sourced from the International Ski Federation (FIS).

Olympic Games

World Championships

World Cup

Season standings

References

External links

Official website 

1984 births
Cross-country skiers at the 2010 Winter Olympics
Living people
Olympic cross-country skiers of Switzerland
Swiss female cross-country skiers
People from Fribourg
Sportspeople from the canton of Fribourg